Hilltop High School is a public high school in West Unity, Ohio.  It is the only high school in the Millcreek-West Unity Local Schools district.  Their nickname is the Cadets.  They are members of the Buckeye Border Conference and, for football only, the Toledo Area Athletic Conference.

Ohio High School Athletic Association State Championships
 Girls Volleyball – 1991

References

External links
 

High schools in Williams County, Ohio
Public high schools in Ohio